The following is a list of awards and nominations received by American actress and singer Mandy Moore.

Amanda Leigh Moore is an American singer, songwriter, and actress. She rose to fame with her debut single, "Candy", which peaked at number 41 on the Billboard Hot 100. Her debut studio album, So Real (1999), received a platinum certification from the RIAA. The title single from her reissue of So Real, I Wanna Be With You (2000), became Moore's first top 40 song in the US, peaking at number 24 on the Hot 100. Moore subsequently released the studio albums Mandy Moore (2001), Coverage (2003), Wild Hope (2007), Amanda Leigh (2009), Silver Landings (2020), and In Real Life (2022). Overall Moore has sold 2.7 million albums in the US according to Billboard.

Moore made her feature film debut in 2001, with a minor voice role in the comedy film Dr. Dolittle 2, before starring as Lana Thomas in the comedy film The Princess Diaries. She received recognition for her starring role as Jamie Sullivan in the romantic drama film A Walk to Remember (2002), and starred in the films Chasing Liberty (2004), Saved! (2004), Racing Stripes (2005), Because I Said So (2007), License to Wed (2007), Love, Wedding, Marriage (2011), 47 Meters Down (2017), The Darkest Minds (2018), and Midway (2019). Moore also voiced Princess Rapunzel in the Disney animated fantasy musical comedy film Tangled (2010) and her later appearances in Disney media.

Since 2016, Moore has starred as Rebecca Pearson in the NBC family comedy-drama series This Is Us. For her performance, she was nominated for the Golden Globe Award for Best Supporting Actress and the Primetime Emmy Award for Outstanding Lead Actress in a Drama Series, and won two Screen Actors Guild Awards for Outstanding Performance by an Ensemble in a Drama Series. 
In 2019, Moore was awarded a star on the Hollywood Walk of Fame. In 2012, Moore was ranked number 96 on VH1's list of "100 Greatest Women in Music" as well as number 63 on their "Sexiest Artists of All Time List".

Awards and nominations

Listicles

Notes

References

Lists of awards received by American actor
Awards

es:Anexo:Premios y nominaciones de Mandy Moore
fr:Liste des récompenses et nominations de Mandy Moore
pt:Anexo:Lista de prêmios e indicações recebidos por Mandy Moore
ru:Список наград и номинаций Кэти Перри
tr:Mandy Moore'nin kazandığı ve aday gösterildiği ödüller listesi